Durval Junqueira Machado (12 June 1900 – 12 April 1959) was a Brazilian footballer. He played in five matches for the Brazil national football team from 1920 to 1940. He was also part of Brazil's squad for the 1920 South American Championship.

References

External links
 

1900 births
1959 deaths
Brazilian footballers
Brazil international footballers
Place of birth missing
Association footballers not categorized by position